Pyrausta apicalis is a moth in the family Crambidae. It was described by George Hampson in 1913. It is found in South Africa, Eswatini and Zimbabwe.

References

Moths described in 1913
apicalis
Moths of Africa